The Women's scratch was held on 20 October 2016.

Results

References

Women's scratch
European Track Championships – Women's scratch